Werner Bühse (born 27 November 1951) is a German former sports shooter. He competed in the trap event at the 1968 Summer Olympics for West Germany. Two years later, he won the European Championships.

References

External links
 

1951 births
Living people
German male sport shooters
Olympic shooters of West Germany
Shooters at the 1968 Summer Olympics
People from Neumünster
Sportspeople from Schleswig-Holstein
20th-century German people
21st-century German people